EGL is an interface between Khronos rendering APIs (such as OpenGL, OpenGL ES or OpenVG) and the underlying native platform windowing system. EGL handles graphics context management, surface/buffer binding, rendering synchronization, and enables "high-performance, accelerated, mixed-mode 2D and 3D rendering using other Khronos APIs." EGL is managed by the non-profit technology consortium Khronos Group.

The acronym EGL is an initialism, which starting from EGL version 1.2 refers to Khronos Native Platform Graphics Interface. Prior to version 1.2, the name of the EGL specification was OpenGL ES Native Platform Graphics Interface. X.Org development documentation glossary defines EGL as "Embedded-System Graphics Library".

Adoption 

 The BlackBerry 10 and BlackBerry Tablet OS mobile device operating system uses EGL for 3D graphics rendering. Both support EGL version 1.4.
 The Android mobile device operating system uses EGL for 3D graphics rendering.
 The Wayland display server protocol uses EGL. It is implemented in a way that Wayland clients will draw directly to the framebuffer using EGL.
 Mesa 3D has an implementation of EGL formerly known as Eagle.
 The Mir display server protocol by Canonical Ltd. uses EGL.
 The Simple DirectMedia Layer toolkit has been ported to use EGL. It can use Xlib, write directly to the framebuffer or use EGL.
 The Raspberry Pi single-board computer has an EGL interface to hardware-accelerated 3D graphics rendering.
 The proprietary Nvidia driver 331.13 BETA from 4 October 2013 supports the EGL API.
 Tizen OS uses EGL with either OpenGL ES 1.1 or OpenGL ES 2.0 for 3D graphics rendering

Implementations 
 Mesa is a free and open-source software implementation of many graphic rendering APIs; among them is EGL.
 Generic Buffer Management is an API to manage buffers.

See also 
 WGL – the equivalent Windows interface to OpenGL
 CGL – the equivalent OS X interface to OpenGL
 GLX – the equivalent X11 interface to OpenGL
 AIGLX – an attempt to accelerate GLX
 WSI – the Vulkan Window System Interface (WSI) does for Vulkan what EGL does for OpenGL ES.

References

External links 
 

Application layer protocols
Application programming interfaces
Free graphics software
Free windowing systems